Mike Coykendall is a musician, audio engineer, and record producer.

Born in Norwich, Kansas in 1963, Coykendall was a member of the Wichita-based Klyde Konnor, which performed and recorded frequently throughout the 1980s and early 1990s. He moved to San Francisco in 1991 and released three critically acclaimed albums with the Old Joe Clarks. After moving to Portland, Oregon in 1999, he set up a home studio, where he recorded albums for a myriad of bands, including She & Him, M. Ward, Beth Orton, Richmond Fontaine, Tin Hat Trio, Blitzen Trapper, and Bright Eyes.

As a solo artist, he has released the albums Hello Hello Hello (Stereotype, 2005), The Unbearable Being of Likeness (Field Hymns, 2010), Chasing Away the Dots (Fluff and Gravy, 2012), and Half Past, Present Pending (Fluff and Gravy, 2015).

Discography
 Half Past, Present Pending (Fluff & Gravy, 2015)
 Chasing Away the Dots (Fluff & Gravy, 2012)  
 The Unbearable Being of Likeness (Field Hymns, 2010) 
 Hello Hello Hello (Stereotype, 2005)

As guest
 Four Winds, Bright Eyes (Saddle Creek, 2007)
 Volume One, She & Him  (Merge, 2008)
 Volume Two, She & Him  (Merge, 2010)

References

External links
Official Website

American audio engineers
American male singer-songwriters
Musicians from Portland, Oregon
Living people
Singer-songwriters from Oregon
1963 births
She & Him members